It Was All a Dream is the third studio album by American rapper Lil' Keke from Houston, Texas. It was released on July 13, 1999 via Jam Down Records. It was reissued in 2003 by another Houston-based record label Rap Classics. The album features guest appearances from 8Ball, Big Hawk, Big Pokey, B-Legit, Juvenile, Krazy, Madd Hatta, South Park Mexican, and more.

Track listing

Charts

References

External links

 

1999 albums
Lil' Keke albums